Henrik Jensen (born 1 February 1978) is a Danish former professional footballer who played as a defender in Denmark, England and the United States.

Career
Born in Vejle, Jensen started his career with Fredericia KFUM, before moving to Eastbourne United in England. He returned to Denmark to play for Vejle Boldklub in 2003, before joining United States team Charleston Battery in 2004. He signed for Danish club FC Fredericia in February 2005. When his contract expired in December 2006, he moved to Norwegian club Kristiansund BK in January 2007. He ended his career with lower-league Danish club Vinding SF.

He returned to Gauerslund in 2009, in order to coach the local lower-league team.

Personal life
Jensen got his nickname of "Gauer" from his childhood hometown of Gauerslund halfway between Vejle and Fredericia.

References

1978 births
Living people
Danish men's footballers
Eastbourne United F.C. players
Vejle Boldklub players
Charleston Battery players
Association football defenders
People from Vejle Municipality
Sportspeople from the Region of Southern Denmark